Spinetinglers is a series of 30 standalone middle-grade horror novels, written by multiple authors and published under the pseudonym, M.T. Coffin. It was one of the many series of scary books for middle-grade children released in the 1990s, following in the footsteps of R.L. Stine's Goosebumps.

Books in the series
 1. The Substitute Creature (March 1995) (Kathleen Duey) - Elementary students Jace Morgan and Abram Saeb begin to suspect their new substitute teacher Mr. Hiss is an extraterrestrial after a series of bizarre events, including him spreading blood on his hands and face in the men's room. 
 2. Billy Baker's Dog Won't Stay Buried (April 1995) (George Edward Stanley) - When Billy's dog bites a nasty neighbor and is put down in retaliation, Billy firmly believes his pet isn't gone for good... and indeed, the animal returns from the grave with an army of undead canine companions. 
 3. My Teacher's a Bug (May 1995) (Robert Hawks) - Ryan and his family move to Texas for his father's new job, and when he is put on new allergy medication, Ryan becomes able to see his teachers for what they are: overgrown insects plotting a total takeover. 
 4. Where Have All the Parents Gone? (July 1995) (George Edward Stanley) - When the parents of Broxton begin to go missing, some kids and teenagers react by having fun. Others set out to uncover the truth, and discover a secret alien invasion going on. 
 5. Check It Out-And Die! (September 1995) (George Edward Stanley) - Charlie and Dustin are initially happy that their new school librarian has been stocking the library with horror stories but soon discover that their fellow students are vanishing, and the stories are coming to life. 
 6. Simon Says, Croak! (November 1995) (Kathleen Duey) - Alexander has moved to a new town and a new school and begins to receive messages from the deceased former owner of the desk in his classroom. 
 7. Snow Day (December 1995) (Robert Hawks) - A group of students face terror when their school bus is caught in a raging snowstorm and they're forced to seek shelter at a sinister-looking abandoned farm. 
 8. Don't Go to the Principal's Office (March 1996) (George Edward Stanley) - Mr. Amsted is the new principal at Crosswell Elementary School, and Richard and Ted begin to suspect something is up when the students sent to his office undergo a complete personality change... possibly from being lobotomized. 
 9. Step on a Crack (May 1996) (C. J. Henderson) - The sidewalks are cracking, there are a strange fragrance and mysterious growls in the air... and only one kid can find evidence that any of this is out of the ordinary. 
 10. The Dead Kid Did It (June 1996) (George Edward Stanley) - Dunning comes face to face with a pranking ghost who's framing him for the ghost's actions. 
 11. Fly by Night (July 1996) (Kathleen Duey) - The crows in town are acting strangely, and Ty believes old Mrs. Crow may know something about it. 
 12. Killer Computer (August 1996) (Bob Hirschfeld) - Jenny and her younger brother Brian encounter a monstrous creature that wants to escape from cyberspace and into the real world, bringing its deadly games with it. 
 13. Pet Store (September 1996) (George Edward Stanley) - Amber and her family move to a new town, but Amber soon finds out the dogs are really in charge, while the humans are their pets. 
 14. Blood Red EightBall (October 1996) (Jim DeFelice) - Craig gets pulled into a pool-themed virtual reality game, where he soon finds that the Eight Ball isn't like normal ones... it's evil. 
 15. Escape from the Haunted Museum (November 1996) (George Edward Stanley) - Trapped in a museum overnight, Tony and his friends discover that the exhibits come to life during the late hours. 
 16. We Wish You a Scary Christmas (December 1996) (George Edward Stanley) - A pair of kids discover that their neighbors are holding an amnesiac Santa Claus in their home. 
 17. The Monster Channel (January 1997) (Jim Simon) - Charley discovers a spooky old television in the attic of his new home, which only has one channel - the Monster Channel, which begins releasing monsters into the real world. 
 18. Mirror, Mirror (February 1997) (Kathleen Duey) - Jake thinks it's great that the reflection in his spoon can talk to him. But he soon finds out that the "reflection" is an evil creature. 
 19. Boogey's Back for Blood (March 1997) (Michael Vlessides) - When he finds a mysterious old tome, Mike Jacobs accidentally reawakens the evil Boogeyman from his four-century slumber. 
 20. Lights, Camera, Die! (April 1997) (Mike Ford) - Mr. Faust runs the Oddity Theater, playing horror films day and night. But it soon turns out he's trapping kids, invited as special guests, in the movies. 
 21. Camp Crocodile (May 1997) (Jim DeFelice) - A summer camp turns out to be more than it seems when a giant crocodile begins targeting the kids. 
 22. Student Exchange (June 1997)(Mike Ford) - Something weird is going on at Westview Elementary School, as James discovers when one of his classmates disappears and a mysterious boy turns up wearing the same pendant as the odd new kid Marilyn. 
 23. Gimme Back My Brain (July 1997) (Robert Hawks) - Max encounters a pair of mad scientists who are creating a super robot and want to use his brain as the final piece. At first, he thinks his new robotic body is great, but he soon finds out that no one believes it's him, and the scientists are out to bring him under their total control. 
 24. Your Turn - To Scream (August 1997) (Kathleen Duey) - Michael gets sucked into a mysterious board game, and must play his way through assorted dangers to escape. 
 25. The Curse of the Cheerleaders (September 1997) (George Edward Stanley) - The cheerleaders at Lincoln Elementary School have developed the ability to hypnotize people, and are using their new powers to take control of others for their sinister purposes. 
 26. Wear and Scare (October 1997) (Kathleen Duey) - Sam and his friends are preparing for a school event and rent Halloween costumes from creepy old Mr. Slithern, only to find that the costumes are much more than they seem. 
 27. Lizard People (November 1997) (Jim DeFelice) - Michael gets caught in an alternate world where everyone, including himself, is now a lizard person instead of a human and must try to escape. 
 28. Circus F.R.E.A.K.S. (December 1997) (George Edward Stanley) - Charlie and Jeanna decide to dress up as freaks for the school circus play. However, they find themselves in a lot of danger when a real circus comes to town with some real freaks. 
 29. My Dentist Is a Vampire (January 1998) (Jim DeFelice) - Brian's new dentist is Dr. Van, whose office turns out to be a house of horror, home to bloodsuckers of all kinds, including Dr. Van himself. 
 30. Saber-Toothed Tiger (February 1998) (Jim DeFelice) - The neighbor of Alan Evans goes missing after Alan sees a trio of menacing-looking cats outside the neighbor's home. Now, the cats are after Alan, and he must fight back by taking feline form himself.

External links
 Book list
 Another book list

 Young adult novel series
 Horror novel series
 American horror novels
 Works published under a pseudonym
 Book series introduced in 1995